Bilgi or Bilagi may refer to:

Places
 Bilgi, Karnataka, a taluk in the Bagalkot district of Karnataka, India.
 Bilgi is a small village in Siddapura, Uttara Kannada district of Karnataka, India
 Istanbul Bilgi University

People
 Funda Bilgi, Turkish volleyball player

Turkish-language surnames